The National Association of Local Newspapers (LLA) is a Norwegian association for local newspapers. The organization was established in Voss in 1976, and it works for its member companies' general conditions and interests. 

Among the first issues it dealt with was inclusion of the smallest local newspapers in the direct press support system, which occurred in 1989. The association is now a co-owner of the Norwegian Audit Bureau of Circulations, the company responsible for monitoring newspapers' circulation figures. These figures are the basis for receiving press subsidies. The association also represents its member companies in various government agencies and committees.

The National Association of Local Newspapers is not a tariff organization, and therefore does not negotiate on behalf of its member companies. Some of the association's members are also members of the Norwegian Media Businesses' Association (MBL).

The National Association of Local Newspapers has over 100 small newspapers as members, representing a combined circulation of 330,000, or 950,000 readers. Most of the member newspapers are published one to three times a week, and they usually appear in print runs of 1,000 to 6,000 copies.

The secretariat of the association is in Oslo, and Rune Hetland is its general secretary. The association's board is headed by Ståle Melhus, who is also the editor of the local newspaper Fanaposten. The Local Newspaper of the Year prize is awarded at the association's annual meeting.

Members (as of January 2012) 

 Akers Avis Groruddalen
 Åmliavisa
 Andøyposten
 Arendals Tidende
 Askøyværingen
 Ås Avis
 Birkenesavisa
 Bø blad
 Bømlo-nytt
 Bremanger Budstikke
 Bygdanytt
 Bygdebladet
 Bygdebladet Randaberg og Rennesøy
 Dag og Tid
 Dalane Tidende
 Dølen
 Drangedalsposten
 Eidsvoll Ullensaker Blad
 Eikerbladet
 Enebakk Avis
 Fanaposten
 Finnmarksposten
 Fjell-Ljom
 Fjordabladet
 Fjordingen
 Fjuken
 Framtia
 Framtid i Nord
 Frolendingen
 Frostingen
 Gamlebyavisen
 Gaula
 Gauldalsposten
 Gjesdalbuen
 Grannar
 Grenda
 Hallingdølen
 Hammerfestingen
 Hardanger Folkeblad
 Hordaland
 Hordaland Folkeblad
 Inderøyningen
 Jarlsberg Avis
 Kanalen
 KlæbuPosten
 Klar Tale
 Kvinnheringen
 Kyst og Fjord
 Lierposten
 Lofot-Tidende
 Lokalavisa NordSalten
 Lokalavisa Verran-Namdalseid
 Marsteinen
 Meløyavisa
 Meråkerposten
 Møre
 Nordre
 Nordvestnytt
 Nye Troms
 Øksnesavisa
 OPP
 Os og Fusaposten
 Østerdølen
 Østhavet
 Øyavis
 Øy-Blikk
 Øyene
 Øyposten
 Raumnes
 Røyken og Hurums Avis
 Ryfylke
 Ságat
 Saltenposten
 Samningen
 Sande Avis
 Sandnesposten
 Selbyggen
 Snåsningen
 Søgne og Songdalen Budstikke
 Solabladet
 SolungAvisa
 SortlandsAvisa
 Søvesten
 Stangeavisa
 Steinkjer-Avisa
 Storfjordnytt
 Strandbuen
 Strilen
 Sulaposten
 Suldalsposten
 Sunnhordland
 Sunnmøringen
 Svalbardposten
 Svelviksposten
 Sydvesten
 Sykkylvsbladet
 Synste Møre
 Tysnes
 Tysvær Bygdeblad
 Våganavisa
 VaksdalPosten
 Varangeren
 Varingen
 Vennesla Tidende
 Vest-Telemark Blad
 Vestavind
 Vesteraalens Avis
 Vestby Avis
 Vestlandsnytt
 Vestnesavisa
 Vestnytt
 Vigga

References

External links
 National Association of Local Newspapers website

Norwegian journalism organisations
Organizations established in 1976